Maria Venus Bayonito Raj (born July 7, 1988) is a Filipino actress, model, and beauty pageant titleholder who was crowned Binibining Pilipinas Universe 2010. She represented the Philippines at the Miss Universe 2010 pageant and placed 4th Runner-Up.

Raj placed as fourth runner-up in 59th Miss Universe pageant, where she is known for her answer "Major Major".

Early life and education
Maria Venus Raj was born in Doha, Qatar, to an Indian-American father and a Filipino mother, the youngest of five children. She came to the Philippines while still an infant and was raised in Bato, Camarines Sur.

For the first two decades of her life, Raj lived in a nipa hut made of wood, bamboo and anahaw leaves, with no electricity, in the middle of a sprawling rice field. She allegedly used rice paddy dikes for her early training, where she eventually developed her distinctive walk.

Raj started out by joining local beauty pageants, as well as oratorical contests at San Vicente High School, where her English teacher served as her coach. Using the prize money won in major contests, she then bought land on an installment basis for her mother to help improve their livelihood.

Raj obtained her bachelor's degree in communication arts, major in journalism, at Bicol University in Legazpi City, with Latin honors (cum laude). She graduated through the scholarship that she received from the Francis Papica Foundation. She initially worked as an Information Assistant for the Department of Environment and Natural Resources for Bicol Region. It was at this time that she also worked as a part-time fashion model in both her native Bicol and Manila. 

In 2017, Raj completed her master's degree in community development from the University of the Philippines Diliman.

In June 2021, she graduated from Oxford Centre for Christian Apologetics (OCCA), Oxford, England.

Pageantry

Miss Philippines Earth 2008 
Raj first competed in Miss Philippines Earth 2008 where she was crowned as Miss Philippines Eco Tourism 2008.

Binibining Pilipinas 2010

After joining Miss Philippines Earth 2008, Raj took a break from beauty contests and worked as an Information Assistant at the regional office of the Department of Environment and Natural Resources. On March 6, 2010, she was crowned Binibining Pilipinas Universe 2010 during the pageant's Grand Coronation Night at the Araneta Coliseum. She also won the special awards for Best in Long Gown, Best in Philippine Terno, and Miss Friendship. She gained the right to represent the Philippines at the 2010 Miss Universe pageant in Las Vegas, Nevada.

Miss Universe 2010

The Philippines' pending participation at Miss Universe 2010 attracted international attention due to Binibining Pilipinas' controversial initial dethronement of Raj for citizenship reasons. However, due to increasing public pressure and the ensuing intervention of the Miss Universe Organization under Donald Trump, national director Stella Araneta and the country's Department of Foreign Affairs made an agreement with Raj to reinstate her to the national title upon making an exception to grant her a Philippine passport. Raj eventually travelled in August 2010 to Las Vegas, United States and became the official Philippine delegate to the competition. 

During the Miss Universe competition, Raj was emotionally distressed to hear about the death of Filipino-German beauty queen Melody Gersbach and make-up artist Alden Orense in a car accident. Gersbach, a fellow Bicolana who previously competed and placed in the Top 15 at Miss International 2009 in China, was one of Raj's coaches in her preparation for the Miss Universe pageant. Raj was one of six delegates who were handpicked for a media tour, Raj, along with Jesinta Campbell of Australia, Natalia Navarro of Colombia, Sarodj Bertin of Haiti, Ximena Navarrete of Mexico, Mariana Vicente of Puerto Rico and Miss Universe 2009 Stefania Fernandez were scheduled for several television appearances prior to the actual pageant in Las Vegas. Raj received the highest rating in the Miss Universe website, with 3.54 points, the highest-ever for a Philippine delegate.

Raj was the last delegate to be announced to the Top 15, signalling both an end to a 10-year semifinal drought for the Philippines and the beginning of its streak of appearances at Miss Universe during the live finale up to 2021 - the country's longest in its history on the pageant. During the Miss Universe question and answer portion, Raj was asked by American actor William Baldwin about the biggest mistake that she made in her life and what she did to make it right, to which she simply replied that she had never made any big mistakes in her life, citing the famed answer "Major Major" in her response. Raj eventually finished in the Top 5 as 4th runner-up to winner Navarrete from Mexico, marking the Philippines' highest placement at Miss Universe since Miriam Quiambao placed second in the competition in 1999.

Television career
Prior and after Miss Universe, Raj guested on multiple networks as guests. Eventually she was offered hosting stints including a spot in the morning show Umagang Kay Ganda. In 2011, Raj signed up an exclusive contract with ABS-CBN, coinciding with the network gaining the airing rights of the Binibining Pilipinas pageant for at least five years. In 2013, she left on hosting Umagang Kay Ganda due on the reformat of the show. Less busy with entertainment commitments, Raj pursued her master's degree in Community Development at the University of the Philippines Diliman and lent a hand to the group called “Care For Children.”

Filmography

Television

Film

Awards and nominations

See also
 Addy Raj

Notes

References

External links

Living people
1988 births
Actresses from Camarines Sur
Bicolano actors
Binibining Pilipinas winners
Filipino people of Indian descent
Filipino female models
Miss Universe 2010 contestants
University of the Philippines Diliman alumni
ABS-CBN News and Current Affairs people